George Shelby may refer to:

George Shelby, character in Uncle Tom's Cabin
George Shelby (musician) on Santamental album